The Dandaleith stone is a Class I Pictish stone from Craigellachie, Scotland. It was discovered in May 2013 during ploughing.

Location
The exact location of the find is currently unreported due to the archaeological vulnerability of the site. The stone underwent conservation before going on display at Elgin museum.

Description
It bears incised Pictish symbols on two adjacent faces, a notched rectangle and z rod and mirror case on one and an eagle and crescent and v rod on another. The arrangement of symbols on adjacent faces is unusual and may be unique.

References

Pictish stones
Undeciphered writing systems